The Nebraska Lottery is run by the government of Nebraska. It was established by the state legislature in 1993. It is a member of the Multi-State Lottery Association (MUSL). Its games include Mega Millions, Powerball, 2by2, Nebraska Pick 5, Pick 3, and MyDaY. The minimum age to purchase Nebraska Lottery tickets is 19. Elsewhere in the United States, the minimum age to buy lottery tickets is either 18 or 21.

Except for Powerball, whose winning numbers are drawn with numbered balls in Tallahassee, Florida and Mega Millions in Atlanta, Georgia, Nebraska Lottery games are drawn by a random number generator (RNG). (Mega Millions uses an RNG to determine its Megaplier.) The keno games available in Nebraska are municipal lotteries; these predate the Nebraska Lottery.

Draw games

Multi-jurisdictional games

2by2

2by2, also played in Kansas and North Dakota, is drawn nightly. Two red numbers and two white numbers (each 1 through 26) are drawn. Games are $1; there are seven ways to win. Matching all four numbers wins $22,000; it is doubled if won on a Tuesday, and the ticket was bought for seven consecutive draws.

Mega Millions

In 1996, six lotteries began The Big Game; it became Mega Millions in 2002. In January 2010, Mega Millions and Powerball became available to lotteries which had either game. Mega Millions became available in Nebraska on March 20, 2010.

Mega Millions is drawn Tuesdays and Fridays; its jackpots begin at $40 million and continues to grow by at least $5 million each drawing until it is won.

Powerball

Nebraska joined Powerball in 1994. Powerball jackpots begin at $40 million and continues to grow by at least $10 million each drawing until it is won; it is drawn Wednesdays and Saturdays.

The then-largest lottery prize in American history for a single set of numbers was on a Nebraska ticket for Powerball in a 2006 drawing. The entire $365 million was shared by eight people, who chose the cash option.

Lucky for Life

The Connecticut Lottery, in 2009, began an in-house game called Lucky-4-Life. After several format changes, the game became quasi-national in 2015. As of 2019, Lucky for Life is available in 25 states and the District of Columbia.

The Nebraska Lottery began offering Lucky for Life on August 20, 2017.

In-house games

Pick 3
Pick 3 began in 2004 and is drawn daily. Play styles and prizes vary.

MyDaY
MyDaY also has daily draws. Players pick a number representing a month, a number 1 through 28, 29, 30, or 31 for a day in that month, and the last two digits of a year. Games are $1 each; top prize is $5,000.

Nebraska Pick 5
Nebraska Pick 5 also has daily draws. It draws five numbers 1 through 38. Each play is $1. Its jackpot begins at $50,000.

Former games
Nebraska was part of the MUSL game Wild Card when it began in 1998. The game's format changed in May 1999, becoming Wild Card 2; simultaneously, Nebraska pulled out. Wild Card 2 remained available in Idaho, Montana, North Dakota, and South Dakota until 2016.

References

External links
Official Website

State lotteries of the United States
Computer-drawn lottery games